MV Guanabara is an oil tanker which was attacked by four pirates on 5 March 2011.

The tanker was attacked by four armed Somali pirates at 3pm on 5 March 2011. The pirates were captured without a fight. Three of the pirates were indicted in Japan. The fourth was turned over to juvenile authorities, as it was determined that he was a minor.

References

Merchant ships of Japan
Maritime incidents in 2011
Oil tankers
Piracy in Somalia
2007 ships
Ships built in Japan